The Porn Kings were a British dance music group from Liverpool.

Originally formed by Davy T, Paul Rowland, and Dan Evans, the group's first single was released as a white label called "Pumping the Junk". It featured an original sample from Josh Wink's "Higher State of Consciousness". The track was picked up very quickly by All Around the World Productions where it was reworked and renamed "Up to No Good" in 1996.

The debut release became a hit in Germany, the United Kingdom, Canada, and the United States. They released an album, Up to No Good, in 1999. Additionally, they did remixes for DJ Quicksilver, Young MC, Josh Wink, and Pamela Fernandez. Their  track "We're Watching You" was included on the soundtrack to the 2001 film, The Hole starring Thora Birch and Keira Knightley.

Kenny Hayes joined the group to help write the second single and the group's debut album.

Further UK hits included "Amour (C'Mon)", "Up to the Wildstyle", "Sledger", and "Shake Ya Shimmy".

Discography

Studio albums

Singles

Rock the Dancefloor
Many of their songs are also featured on the Rock the Dancefloor compilation series of albums made by All Around the World for Preston-based radio station Rock FM.  Two of their tracks featured on each album up to the fourth series.

Rock the Dancefloor 1
"Up to tha Wildstyle" - Disc 1 Track 2 - Porn Kings vs DJ Supreme
"Up to No Good" - Disc 1 Track 7 - Porn Kings

Rock the Dancefloor 2
"Up to tha Wildstyle '99 Remix" - Disc 1 Track 4 - Porn Kings vs DJ Supreme
"Kickin' the Beat" - Disc 2 Track 8 - Porn Kings feat Pamela Ferrandez

Rock the Dancefloor 3
"It's a Party" - Disc 1 Track 5 - Porn Kings
"La B-Bop" - Disc 2 Track 5 - Porn Kings

Rock the Dancefloor 4
"Sledger (Nasty Boyz Remix)" - Disc 1 Track 9 - Porn Kings
"Amour (C'mon)" - Disc 2 Track 9 - Porn Kings

References

English dance music groups
Musical groups from Liverpool
All Around the World Productions artists